Sayori (written  among other ways) is a feminine Japanese given name. Notable people and fictional characters with the name include:
Sayori Ishizuka, Japanese voice actress
Sayori, a character in the video game Doki Doki Literature Club!
Sayori Wakaba, a character in the manga Vampire Knight
Sayori Mizushima, a character in the manga Love Lab
Sayori Uno,  character in the manga Magical Girl Ore

Japanese feminine given names